Mary Kok (born in 1940 in Hilversum) is a renowned Dutch swimmer. Between 1954 and 1957 she set ten world records from the young age of 15 to 17 years: 
440 yd freestyle
880 yd freestyle
800 m freestyle
1760 yd freestyle
100 yd butterfly
100 m butterfly
400 yd individual medley
400 m individual medley
1 relay

Kok was to swim in the 1956 Summer Olympics in Melbourne for the Dutch Olympic Team until the night before she was to depart when the Netherlands boycotted the competition over Russia's invasion of Hungary In 2016 Kok, along with other athletes whose athletic careers were affected by the boycott were honoured by the Hungarian government. Kok said in her speech, she had always felt that her gold medal was at the bottom of the swimming pool in Melbourne, but that the Hungarian people gave her the feeling that the honorary medal was given to her wholeheartedly. In 1960, Kok became first Dutch woman to swim the English Channel

In 1955, she became Dutch Sportsman of the year and in 1980, was inducted to the International Swimming Hall of Fame. 

On 28 December 1962, she married Kees Oudegeest, and later became a swimming coach.

In 2015, Kok was invited by the Dutch Sports Federation to be recognised at their annual Athlete of the Year event. Kok won Athlete of the Year in 1955 at the age of 15 years.

See also
 List of members of the International Swimming Hall of Fame
World record progression 800 metres freestyle

External links
https://nos.nl/artikel/2075680-muizenmethode-maakte-zwemster-mary-kok-de-beste.html A video interview after the Athlete of the Year ceremony

References

1940 births
Living people
Dutch female freestyle swimmers
English Channel swimmers
World record setters in swimming
Dutch female long-distance swimmers
Sportspeople from Hilversum
Dutch female butterfly swimmers
Dutch female medley swimmers
20th-century Dutch women